Thelymitra variegata, commonly called the Queen of Sheba, is a species of orchid in the family Orchidaceae and endemic to the south-west of Western Australia. It has a single erect, spiral, dark green leaf with a purplish base and up to five glossy, variegated reddish, purplish or violet flowers with darker spots and blotches and yellowish margins.  There are two bright yellow or orange arms on the sides of the column.

Description
There are two bright yellow or orange ear-like arms on the sides of the column. The flowers are insect pollinated and open widely on hot days. Flowering occurs in August and September.

Taxonomy and naming
The Queen of Sheba was first formally described in 1840 by John Lindley who gave it the name Macdonaldia variegata and published the description in A Sketch of the Vegetation of the Swan River Colony. In 1865 Ferdinand von Mueller changed the name to Thelymitra variegata and published the change in Fragmenta phytographiae Australiae. The specific epithet (variegata) is a Latin word meaning "of different sorts, particularly colors".

Distribution and habitat
The Queen of Sheba grows with low shrubs and grasses in woodland, forest and heath. The flowers are insect pollinated and open on sunny days. It is found between Perth and Albany in the Geraldton Sandplains, Jarrah Forest, Mallee, Swan Coastal Plain and Warren biogeographic regions.

Conservation
Thelymitra variegata is classified as "Priority Two" by the Western Australian Government Department of Parks and Wildlife meaning that it is poorly known and from only one or a few locations.

References

External links

variegata
Endemic orchids of Australia
Orchids of Western Australia
Plants described in 1840
Taxa named by John Lindley